BancCentral National Association (formerly Central National Bank) is a commercial bank based in Alva, Oklahoma. It was built in 1901 and was listed on the National Register of Historic Places in 1984. It had been owned and operated by the Myers family since 1919.

History
The Alva National Bank was established in 1899. Officers of Alva National Bank in 1907 were George A. Harbaugh president, and J.H. Schaefer, vice president. During the years between 1907 and 1913, the Alva Security Bank purchased Alva National Bank with Harbaugh as bank president.

In August 1913, G.A. Harbaugh, E. Anderson, T.F. Fennessey and H.E. Noble, owners of Alva Security, organized a new banking institution under the name Central State Bank. The newly named bank continued to operate at the location of the former Alva Security Bank.  Central State Bank was considered a "state bank," the deposits were insured by the Depositors Guaranty of the State of Oklahoma. On October 31, 1917, Central State Bank absorbed the Woods County Union Bank. Harbaugh and George Meade had controlling stocks of the Union Bank at that time.

In 1919, W.D. Myers purchased a large interest in the bank, becoming the President, a role he held until his death in 1951. In 1951, Gertrude Myers became chairman of the board and CEO of the bank, and her brother, W.D. Myers, Jr., became President. W.D. served as President until his death in 1987.  William R. Buckles was elected President of the bank, and was named CEO following Gertrude's death. At the time of Gertrude's death, L.W. became Chairman of the Board and served until his death.

The Woodward County branches of NationsBank were acquired by CNB on March 13, 1998. That bank had gone through a series of purchases and mergers beginning with the sale of the Bank of Woodward to Bank IV in Wichita, Kansas on May 28, 1993. Kyle D. Hughbanks was named President and CEO.

In 2009, the bank caused controversy by demolishing a parking garage that reportedly contained hundreds of bats, mostly Mexican free tail bats.

In March 2012, the bank changed its name to BancCentral National Association (BancCentral, N.A).

In March 2021, Office of the Comptroller of the Currency (OCC) placed a Consent Order on the bank for "engaging in unsafe or unsound practices".  The OCC's charges specifically listed detailed charges involving management, board supervision, capital planning, and risk ratings.  Additional charges involved loan reviews, allowance for loan and lease losses, and credit administration.  The Consent order formally initiated cease and desist proceedings against the facility.

On December 9th 2021, the board of directors signed the consent order, agreeing to implement a litany of OCC mandated changes to the bank's operations.

References

External links

Bank buildings on the National Register of Historic Places in Oklahoma
Commercial buildings completed in 1901
Buildings and structures in Woods County, Oklahoma
National Register of Historic Places in Woods County, Oklahoma